Florida Educator Accomplishment Practices are competencies provided by the Florida Education Standards Commission for teacher development. FEAPs are divided into three sections: Paraprofessional, Professional and Accomplished.

Paraprofessional, Professional and Accomplished FEAPs 
At all three divisions, the person performs certain activities that may take one or more of the following FEAPs: assessment, communication, continuous improvement, critical thinking, diversity, ethics, human development & learning, knowledge of subject matter, learning environments, planning, role of the teacher, and technology.

Education in Florida
Examinations